Radoľa is a village and municipality in Kysucké Nové Mesto District in the Zilina Region of northern Slovakia.

History
In historical records the village was first mentioned in 1332.

The Manor-house in Radola 

The village contains The Manor-house in Radola, one of the oldest monuments in Kysuce, Slovakia.

Geography
The municipality lies at an altitude of 300 metres and covers an area of 6.722 km². It has a population of about 1370 people.

External links
 http://www.statistics.sk/mosmis/eng/run.html (?DEAD LINK)
 Village website (in Slovak)
 football club

Villages and municipalities in Kysucké Nové Mesto District